Retreat is a historic home located at Port Tobacco, Charles County, Maryland, United States. It is a one-story, clapboard-sheathed, frame house with a double chimney. The principal part of the house was built about 1770. Also located on the property is a frame, pyramid-roofed meathouse, dating from the early 19th century, and moved here from another historic property in the county known as "Brentland" in 1953. The home, approached by a private gravel road, is surrounded by cultivated fields, meadows, and woodland, preserving its original agricultural and rural setting. The house is one of the earliest known examples of the side-passage, two-room dwelling in Charles County. It is associated with Daniel of St. Thomas Jenifer and Daniel Jenifer.

Retreat was listed on the National Register of Historic Places in 1988.

References

External links
, including undated photo, at Maryland Historical Trust

Houses in Charles County, Maryland
Houses on the National Register of Historic Places in Maryland
Houses completed in 1770
National Register of Historic Places in Charles County, Maryland
1770 establishments in Maryland
Jenifer family
Homes of United States Founding Fathers